Denis Jeambar (born 1948 in Valréas) is a French journalist.

Biography
Having started his career at Paris-Match in 1970, he joined Le Point in 1972, rising to chief of its political staff in 1981. In 1988 he became editor-in-chief, as well as editor-in-chief of the political and cultural staffs. In 1995, Jeambar became general director of Europe 1 and after a few months, of L'Express. In 2001 he became president of the directory of Groupe Express-Expansion. In August 2006, he became director of Seuil editions.

According to the French electronic magazine La République des Lettres, Jeambar is ideologically close to neoconservatism, having displayed in the French journal L'Express "the opinion of the neoconservative, atlantist and zionist french right, mostly represented recently in France by former President Nicolas Sarkozy". René-Éric Dagorn underlines Jeambar's ideological proximity with Samuel Huntington, author of the "Clash of civilizations": according to him, Denis Jeambar and Alain Louyot have written an article published in L'Express, September 13, 2001, in which "all the arguments point to Huntington [...]".

According to French author Guillaume Weill-Raynal Denis Jeambar, along with journalist Daniel Leconte, has played an important role in the building of the controversy around the Muhammad al-Durrah incident.

He has been a member of the think tank Le Siècle.

Bibliography 
Nos enfants nous haïront with Jacqueline Rémy, Éditions du Seuil, 2006
Le défi du monde with Claude Allègre, Fayard, 2006
Accusé Chirac, levez vous !, Seuil, 2005
Les dictateurs à penser et autres donneurs de leçon, Seuil, 2004
Un secret d'état, Odile Jacob, 1997
Questions de France, Fayard, 1996
L'inconnu de Goa, Grasset, 1996
La Grande Lessive : anarchie et corruption with Jean-Marc Lech, Flammarion, 1995
Le jour ou la girafe s'est assise, Arléa, 1994
Le self-service électoral, with Jean-Marc Lech,  Flammarion, 1993
Le poisson pourrit par la tête, with José Frèches, Seuil, 1992
Éloge de la trahison : de l'art de gouverner par le reniement en collaboration with Yves Roucaute, Seuil, 1988
Dieu s'amuse, Robert Laffont, 1985
Le PC dans la maison, Calmann-Lévy, 1984
George Gershwin, Éditions  Mazarine,  1982
Sur la route de Flagstaff, Stock, 1980

References

1948 births
Living people
French male journalists
French male non-fiction writers
People from Vaucluse
Sciences Po alumni
Paris Match writers